Dysglyptogona is a genus of moths of the family Erebidae. The genus was described by Warren in 1889.

Species
Dysglyptogona dissimilis Warren, 1889
Dysglyptogona geminilinea Hampson, 1926
Dysglyptogona morada Felder, 1874
Dysglyptogona murifera Dognin, 1914
Dysglyptogona striatura Hampson, 1926

References

Calpinae